Jesse Fuller Jones House is a historic plantation house in Spring Green, Martin County, North Carolina. It dates to the first quarter of the 19th century and is a -story, four-bay, Federal-style frame dwelling. It has a gable roof and flanking exterior end chimneys. The house features handsomely detailed interior woodwork. Also on the property is a contributing smokehouse.

It was added to the National Register of Historic Places in 1982.

References

Plantation houses in North Carolina
Houses on the National Register of Historic Places in North Carolina
Federal architecture in North Carolina
Houses in Martin County, North Carolina
National Register of Historic Places in Martin County, North Carolina